The Stonelake Bridge, on Winkler Rd. about  west of Newell, in Butte County, South Dakota, was listed on the National Register of Historic Places in 1986.  It was manufactured in 1910.  Also known as the Horse Creek Bridge, it is a pony truss lattice bridge built by the Canton Bridge Co.  The bridge was moved in 1972.

It is significant as "the only single span Pony truss lattice bridge in west central South Dakota".

The bridge was moved again to the Newell Golf Club.

References

Bridges in South Dakota
Bridges completed in 1910
National Register of Historic Places in Butte County, South Dakota
Pony truss bridges